Jenő Fuchs (29 October 1882 – 14 March 1955) was a Hungarian sabre fencer. He competed at the 1908 and 1912 Olympics and won both the individual and team events at both Games. He missed the 1920 Olympics, where Hungary was not allowed to compete, and qualified for the 1924 Games, but left his place in the team to younger fencers. In 1982 he was inducted into the International Jewish Sports Hall of Fame.

Fuchs studied law at the University of Budapest, defended a PhD in 1911, and became a lawyer. Apart from fencing and law, he was a top-ranked rower and bobsledder in Hungary, and worked with the Budapest stock market.

See also
List of select Jewish fencers

References

References to disputing slander 1.) https://www.passport-collector.com/olympic-gold-medal-winner-and-wife-saved-by-wallenberg/

2.) https://hu.m.wikipedia.org/wiki/Fuchs_Jenő

3.) http://www.jewishsports.net/BioPages/JenoFuchs.htm

External links

1882 births
1955 deaths
Martial artists from Budapest
Hungarian male sabre fencers
Jewish male sabre fencers
Jewish Hungarian sportspeople
Olympic fencers of Hungary
Fencers at the 1908 Summer Olympics
Fencers at the 1912 Summer Olympics
Olympic gold medalists for Hungary
Olympic medalists in fencing
International Jewish Sports Hall of Fame inductees
Medalists at the 1908 Summer Olympics
Medalists at the 1912 Summer Olympics
20th-century Hungarian people